The 2016–17 Coupe de France preliminary rounds, Picardie and Nord-Pas de Calais made up the qualifying competition to decide which teams from the Picardie and Nord-Pas de Calais leagues took part in the main competition from round 7. This was the 100th season of the most prestigious football cup competition of France. The competition was organised by the French Football Federation (FFF) and is open to all clubs in French football, as well as clubs from the overseas departments and territories (Guadeloupe, French Guiana, Martinique, Mayotte, New Caledonia (qualification via 2016 New Caledonia Cup), Tahiti (qualification via 2016 Tahiti Cup), Réunion, and Saint Martin).

The qualifying rounds took place between June and October 2016.

First round

First round (Picardie)

First round (Nord-Pas de Calais)

Second round

Second round (Picardie)
These matches were played on 26, 27 and 28 August 2016.

Second round results: Picardie

Second round (Nord-Pas de Calais)
These matches were played on 4 September 2016.

Second round results: Nord-Pas de Calais

Third round

Third round (Picardie)
These matches were played on 10, 11 and 21 September 2016.

Third round results: Picardie

Third round (Nord-Pas de Calais)
These matches were played on 11 September 2016.

Third round results: Nord-Pas de Calais

Fourth round

Fourth round (Picardie)
These matches were played on 24 and 25 September and 2 October 2016.

Fourth round results: Picardie

Fourth round (Nord-Pas de Calais)
These matches were played on 24 and 25 September 2016.

Fourth round results: Nord-Pas de Calais

Fifth round

Fifth round (Picardie)
These matches were played on 9 October 2016.

Fifth round results: Picardie

Fifth round (Nord-Pas de Calais)

These matches were played on 8 and 9 October 2016.

Fifth round results: Nord-Pas de Calais

References

Preliminary rounds